William Grove Speechly (5 July 1906 – 13 July 1982) was a British-Canadian ice hockey player and educator. He was born in Pilot Mound, Manitoba, the son of medic Harry Martindale Speechly and the grandson of John Speechly, the first Anglican Bishop of Travancore and Cochin. He graduated from the University of Manitoba in 1926, travelling to the United Kingdom the following year to continue his studies at St John's College, Cambridge, where he remained for three years, studying classics.

Whilst at Cambridge Speechly was captain of Cambridge University Ice Hockey Club, earning a blue. During this time he was also invited to play as goaltender for the Great Britain men's national ice hockey team. He competed in the 1928 Winter Olympics, finishing fourth with the British team in the Olympic tournament and playing three games. He also played one match in the 1930 World Ice Hockey Championships.

After completing his time at Cambridge, he pursued further study at Harvard University, following which he returned to Canada and taught at the University of Manitoba, Trinity College School in Port Hope, Ontario and Luxton School and Gordon Bell High School in Winnipeg. During World War II, he served in the Royal Winnipeg Rifles as a lieutenant, fighting from the Normandy landings to the Battle of the Scheldt, during which he was seriously injured at the Leopold Canal.

References

External links
 William Speechly's profile at the UK Olympic Committee
 William Speechly's profile at Sports Reference.com

1906 births
1982 deaths
British ice hockey goaltenders
Olympic ice hockey players of Great Britain
Ice hockey players at the 1928 Winter Olympics
Canadian schoolteachers
People from Pilot Mound, Manitoba
University of Manitoba alumni
Alumni of St John's College, Cambridge
Harvard University alumni
Canadian military personnel of World War II
Canadian ice hockey goaltenders
Canadian expatriate ice hockey players in England
Canadian expatriates in the United States
Royal Winnipeg Rifles soldiers
Canadian people of English descent